16 Blocks is a 2006 American action thriller film directed by Richard Donner and starring Bruce Willis, Mos Def, and David Morse. The film unfolds in the real time narration method. It marked the final directed film for Donner in addition to the last acting role for his cousin and frequent collaborator Steve Kahan.

Plot
Jack Mosley is an alcoholic, burned-out NYPD detective. Despite a late shift the night before, his lieutenant orders him to escort a witness, Eddie Bunker, from local custody to the courthouse 16 blocks away to testify on a police corruption case before a grand jury at 10 a.m. Bunker tries to be friendly with Mosley, telling him of his aspirations to move to Seattle to become a cake baker with his sister who he has never met, but Mosley is uninterested, and stops at a liquor store. They are suddenly ambushed by a gunman, and Mosley drags Bunker to a local bar to take shelter and call for backup. Mosley's former partner, Frank Nugent, and several other officers arrive. Nugent and his men are part of the corruption scheme, and he tells Mosley that Bunker is not worth defending as his testimony will likely expose several corrupt officers, including Nugent. The corrupt cops try to frame Bunker for firing at an officer before they try to kill him. Mosley intervenes, rescuing Bunker and fleeing.

Mosley briefly stops at his sister Diane's apartment to retrieve guns and ammo, and learns the police have already approached her about his activities earlier that day. He and Bunker take steps to further elude the police, and Mosley is wounded in the process.  They become cornered in a run-down apartment building as Nugent and his men search floor by floor. Mosley calls the district attorney to arrange for help, but purposely gives the wrong apartment number, suspecting there is a mole involved. Mosley and Bunker are able to escape onto a passenger bus, and as the police follow them, Mosley is forced to treat the passengers as hostages. The bus crashes into a construction site and is soon surrounded by the ESU. Aware that Nugent will likely order the ESU to storm the bus, risking the safety of the passengers, Mosley allows the passengers to go free, using their cover to allow Bunker to sneak off the bus in the confusion. Mosley finds a tape recorder in the discarded possessions on the bus, and prepares a farewell message to Diane.

To his surprise, Bunker returns to the bus; while Nugent is ready to fire on him, Nugent is made to stand down by a superior officer. Bunker has come to see Mosley as an ally, and wants to be there for him to see this through. Bunker's tenacity convinces Mosley to get to the courthouse, and he manages to drive the bus into an alley, temporarily blocking the police from following them. He finds that Bunker has been wounded, and calls Diane, a paramedic, to bring an ambulance around to help, despite knowing she will be followed. Diane tends Mosley and Bunker's wounds, though Bunker still needs further treatment at a hospital. As Diane's ambulance drives away, the police stop her but discover the ambulance is empty; she had a second ambulance pick up Mosley and Bunker that would not be under similar surveillance. Meanwhile, Mosley reveals to Bunker that should he testify, not only will Nugent be convicted but so would Mosley as one of the corrupt cops. Mosley gets off a block from the courthouse and wishes Bunker luck with his bakery, instructing the paramedic to take Bunker to the Port Authority and put him on a bus for Seattle. Bunker promises to send him a cake on his birthday.

Mosley continues to the courthouse, where the police and ESU are waiting for him, as well as the district attorney. Mosley enters the courthouse building through the underground garage, encountering Nugent alone, who tries unsuccessfully to dissuade him from testifying in Bunker's place. Mosley enters the courthouse proper, where one of Nugent's men tries to shoot Mosley but is killed by one of the ESU snipers. Mosley informs the district attorney that he will testify in exchange for Bunker having his record expunged, also revealing that he had recorded the conversation with Nugent in the garage on the tape recorder, which he submits as evidence.

Two years later, Mosley is freed from prison. He celebrates his birthday with Diane and other friends, and is surprised to find that the cake had indeed come from Bunker, who has been successful in starting "Eddie & Jack's Good Sign Bakery" in Seattle.

Cast

Willis originally wanted rapper Ludacris to play the part of Eddie Bunker. 16 Blocks is the second film in which David Morse plays the villain to Bruce Willis as the protagonist; the first was 12 Monkeys.

Release

Theatrical
The film, released by Warner Bros., opened in the United States on March 3, 2006.

Alternate ending
The film was shot with the ending written for the screenplay (as described by Donner and writer Richard Wenk), but they realized during filming that there was "a better opportunity to have a little more empathy and wrap the picture up in a different way." The ending written for the film changed the scenario in which Frank after watching Jack get in the elevator, he instructs Bobby to stand down, saying it's over. But Bobby's radio is off and he is still planning on ambushing Jack. In the lobby Jack is approached by the District Attorney McDonald and says he will testify in Eddie's place in return for Eddie's record being expunged. As Jack reaches into his pocket, Bobby appears and Frank, having run upstairs to stop Bobby, leaps in front of Jack to protect him and gets shot, causing them both to fall down the stairs. When they land at the bottom it's discovered the bullet went through Frank and fatally hit Jack. The tape recorder with Jack and Frank's conversation on it is heard playing in Jack's pocket. Frank tearfully listens and looks at Jack with sorrow. The tape is taken to the jury, Frank and Bobby are led away and a blanket is placed over Jack's body. Sometime later Diane receives a cake from Eddie, supposed to be for Jack's birthday along with a letter saying he sent the cake, hoping to hear from Jack but never did. He was then informed of what happened, he acknowledges Jack and wishes him a happy birthday.

Reception

Box office
In its opening weekend, the film grossed $12.7 million, which was the second-highest grossing film of the weekend. As of its May 15, 2006 closing date, the film grossed a total of $36.895 million in the U.S. box office. It made $65.6 million worldwide. According to Box Office Mojo, production costs were around $55 million. The film made $51.53 million on rentals, and remained on the DVD top 50 charts for 17 consecutive weeks.

Critical response
On Rotten Tomatoes, the film received an approval rating of 56% approval rating from 162 critics, with an average rating of 5.9/10. The site's consensus reads: "Despite strong performances from Bruce Willis and Mos Def, 16 Blocks barely rises above being a shopworn entry in the buddy-action genre."  On Metacritic, it has a weighted average score of 63 out of 100, based on 34 reviews, which indicates "generally favorable reviews". Audiences polled by CinemaScore gave the film an average grade of "B+" on an A+ to F scale.

Michael Atkinson of The Village Voice commented that "the clichés come thick on the ground" and called it "a small movie trying to seem epic, or a bloated monster trying to seem lean." Peter Travers of Rolling Stone gave the film two-and-a-half out of four stars and called Willis and Mos Def "a terrific team," concluding that "Until Richard Wenk's script drives the characters into a brick wall of pukey sentiment, it's a wild ride." Chicago Sun-Times critic Roger Ebert gave it three out of four stars and commended Mos Def for his "character performance that's completely unexpected in an action movie," while calling the film "a chase picture conducted at a velocity that is just about right for a middle-age alcoholic." Wesley Morris of The Boston Globe described the film as admirably old fashioned, praising Donner for his direction, but criticized the film for lacking originality, saying it feels like a remake of The Gauntlet directed by Clint Eastwood.

Remake
In May 2013, Original Entertainment confirmed to have sealed a five-picture deal with Millennium Films to produce Bollywood remakes of Rambo, The Expendables, 16 Blocks, 88 Minutes, and Brooklyn's Finest, with the productions for Rambo and The Expendables expected to start at the end of that year.

References

External links
 16 Blocks Official Site
 
 
 

2006 films
2006 action thriller films
2006 crime thriller films
2000s buddy cop films
2000s police procedural films
Alcon Entertainment films
American action thriller films
American buddy cop films
American crime thriller films
American police detective films
2000s English-language films
Films about corruption in the United States
Films about the New York City Police Department
Films about police misconduct
Films about witness protection
Films directed by Richard Donner
Films scored by Klaus Badelt
Films set in New York City
Films with screenplays by Richard Wenk
MoviePass Films films
Nu Image films
Warner Bros. films
2000s American films